Monkey King vs. Er Lang Shen (Chinese: 孙悟空大战二郎神) is a CG Chinese animated film produced by Yuan Cheng. The story is based on an episode of the 16th-century novel Journey to the West.

Background
The film features puppet live action, about 30% of the movie, with animated 3D backgrounds and characters.

Story
Based on a few early chapters of classic fantasy novel Journey to the West, the story tells how the Monkey King rises against the heaven and has a horrific fight with Er Lang Shen, the nephew of Jade Emperor, who rules the Heaven.

Reception
It was nominated for the Asia Pacific Screen Award for Best Animated Feature Film at the 1st Asia Pacific Screen Awards.

References

External links

Chinese animated films
2007 computer-animated films
2007 films
2000s Mandarin-language films
Films based on Journey to the West